Franz Ignaz Josef Flurer (July or August 1688, Augsburg - June 25, 1742, Graz) was a German painter, best known for his landscapes with figures. Much of his work was done in Austria.

Biography
Little is known of his next few years, but he apparently spent most of them in Styria and, by 1720, he was in the employ of Ignaz Maria Graf Attems (?-1732). His work involved painting canvases and frescoes for the Graf's manors at Slovenska Bistrica, Brežice and Gösting (now part of Graz); work with which he was occupied until 1729. The paintings at Gösting have since been destroyed.

In the early 1730s, he executed frescoes for the casino at Haselsdorf-Tobelbad and the garden pavilion at Schloss Brunnsee in Mureck. He also painted religious works, primarily in Graz. These include a portrait of Saint Giles for the altar in Graz Cathedral. In 1733, he was able to purchase a large home and settle in Graz.

His compositional style was heavily influenced by the works of Annibale Carracci and Pietro da Cortona and his general style derives from the Venetian painters Marco Ricci and Luca Carlevaris. Certain resemblances to the works of Gaspard Dughet and Pieter Mulier have also been pointed out. Although they were French and Dutch, respectively, they spent most of their careers in Italy, which suggests that Flurer spent some time there as well, most likely after studying with Rieger.

References

Further reading
 Franz Ignaz Flurer (1688-1742). Ein Barockmaler in der Steiermark. Exhibition catalog, Kulturreferat der Landeshauptstadt Graz, 1983 Listing @ AbeBooks

External links

 More works by Flurer @ ArtNet
 Flurer @ the Graz website

1688 births
1742 deaths
18th-century German painters
18th-century German male artists
German landscape painters
German emigrants to Austria-Hungary
Artists from Augsburg